Justice Given may refer to:

Josiah Given, associate justice of the Iowa Supreme Court
Leslie E. Given, associate justice of the Supreme Court of Appeals of West Virginia

See also
Richard M. Givan, associate justice and chief justice of the Indiana Supreme Court